Leeds Adel Hockey Club is a field hockey club based in Adel, Leeds, England. The club is also known as 'Leeds Adel' and was renamed from Leeds Adel Carnegie Hockey Club in 2012.

The club is one of the largest in the Leeds area with over 300 members and aims to promote the sport within the community with relations to the local universities and various sporting events held at the club. The club fields six men's teams, five ladies teams, boys and girls junior teams of all ages, mixed, indoor and masters teams.

Leagues 
Leeds Adel hockey club enters teams in various leagues over the season which include the following:

 North Hockey Leagues (Men's 1/2s and Ladies 1/2s)
 Yorkshire Hockey Association League (Men's 3s – 6s and Women's 3s – 5s)

History 
The hockey club first played as a mixed team in 1946, and later the same year forming a Men's 1st XI with an inaugural tour to Aberdeen. Adel Hockey Club was originally a semi-nomadic side playing at Bedquilts, then Ireland Wood and then Soldiers Field.

The Men's 2nd XI was formed in 1950. The invitation to join AWMA gave the club luxuries other local clubs did not have including changing rooms and high-quality grass pitches. Thus regular hockey started being played in 1962 at Adel. In 1970 they merged with Fulneck Old Boys and the Men's 3rd XI was formed.

A decision was made in 1971 to level, drain and seed the top field for hockey and to create a Ladies section. This was followed by the Men's 4th XI being formed in 1974 and the Ladies 2nd being formed in 1981. The Men's 5th XI started in 1985 alongside the Ladies 3rd XI, with the Men's 6th XI in 1991 and the ladies 4th XI in 1993.

The club first laid the artificial surface in 1997, and the first game was played on 29 June 1997. In 2014 after hard fundraising efforts, a new surface was laid and unveiled in time for the start of the 2014–15 season.

More recently, the club won Ladies Team of the Year at the England Hockey Awards in 2016. The Men's 1st XI were shortlisted for the England Hockey Men's Team of the Year award in 2018. Paul Lewis, an Adel member and former club captain was shortlisted for the England Hockey Unsung Hero Award in 2018. The Mixed 1st XI have reached the semi-finals of the England Hockey Championships which is to be played at Lee Valley Hockey and Tennis Centre at the Queen Elizabeth Olympic Park in June 2019.

League Honours & Promotions

Cup honours

2018/2019 season

References

External links 
Yorkshire Hockey Association

English field hockey clubs
Sport in Leeds
Field hockey clubs established in 1960
1960 establishments in England